The Lower League (Niedere Vereinigung, inferiores confederati), also known as the League of Constance, was a union of the four imperial cities Strasbourg, Basel, Colmar and Sélestat, formed in 1473, joined by the bishops of Basel and Strasbourg, Sigismund of Habsburg and by the Old Swiss Confederacy in 1474.

The name of the league is intended to distinguish it from the "upper" (highland) league of the Swiss Confederacy.
The league formed an anti-Burgundian pact, led by Strasbourg, Basel, Berne and Lucerne. The league was concluded in Constance in April 1474 as a result of trilateral negotiations between Sigismund of Habsburg, the Old Swiss Confederacy and the Rhenish towns. 
This collaboration contributed to the final defeat of Charles the Bold and the conclusion of the Burgundian Wars at the Battle of Nancy in 1477.

In the wake of the Burgundian Wars, Basel became a full member of the Swiss Confederacy, while collaboration between the Swiss and the cities of Strasbourg, Colmar and Sélestat would not be resumed.

References

Former confederations